Charaka was one of the principal contributors to Ayurveda, a system of medicine and lifestyle developed in Ancient India. He is known as an editor of the medical treatise entitled Charaka Samhita, one of the foundational texts of classical Indian medicine and Ayurveda, included under Brhat-Trayi.

Date 
After surveying and evaluating all past scholarship on the subject of Charaka's date, Meulenbeld concluded that, the author called Charaka cannot have lived later than about 150-200 CE and not much earlier than about 100 BCE.

Charaka has been identified as a native of either Punjab or Kashmir.
Professor Sylvain Lévi after discovering Buddhist manuscripts in Central Asia and China, came to the conclusion that the famous Charaka, the author of Charaka Samhita belonged to Kashmir. The recension of the text available to us today was done by Acharya Dridhabala, a scholar of Kashmir. Jejjata, the author of commentary on the Charaka Samhita, was also Kashmiri and so was Udbhatta who commented upon Sushruta Samhita.

Charaka and the Ayurveda 

The term Charaka is a label said to apply to "wandering scholars" or "wandering physicians". According to Charaka's translations, health and disease are not predetermined and life may be prolonged by human effort and attention to lifestyle  . As per Indian heritage and Ayurvedic system, prevention of all types of diseases have a more prominent place than treatment, including restructuring of lifestyle to align with the course of nature and six seasons, which will guarantee complete wellness.

Charaka seems to have been an early proponent of "prevention is better than cure" doctrine. The following statement is attributed to Charaka:

A body functions because it contains three dosha or principles, namely movement (vata), transformation (pitta) and lubrication and stability (kapha). The doshas correspond to the Western classification of humors, wind, bile, and phlegm. These doshas are produced when dhatus (blood, flesh and marrow) act upon the food eaten. For the same quantity of food eaten, one body, however, produces dosha in an amount different from another body. That is why one body is different from another.

Further, he stressed, illness is caused when the balance among the three doshas in a human body are disturbed. To restore the balance he prescribed medicinal drugs. Although he was aware of germs in the body, he did not give them primary importance.

Charaka studied the anatomy of the human body and various organs. He gave 360 as the total number of bones, including teeth, present in the human body. He was right when he considered heart to be a controlling centre. He claimed that the heart was connected to the entire body through 13 main channels. Apart from these channels, there were countless other ones of varying sizes which supplied not only nutrients to various tissues but also provided passage to waste products. He also claimed that any obstruction in the main channels led to a disease or deformity in the body  .

Charaka Samhita 

Agnivesha, under the guidance of the ancient physician Atreya, composed an encyclopedic medical compendium in the eighth century BCE, the Agnivesha Samhitā. The work received little attention. The Agnivesha Samhitā was revised by Charaka and renamed the Charaka Samhitā. In this form it became well known. The Charaka Samhitā was itself later supplemented with an extra seventeen chapters added by the author , while retaining its name. The Charaka Samhita is one of the two foundational text of Ayurveda, the other being the Sushruta Samhita. For two millennia it remained a standard work on the subject and was translated into many foreign languages, including Arabic and Latin.

See also
Agastya
Dhanvantari
Siddha medicine
Sushruta

References

External links

Ayurvedacharyas
Ancient Indian physicians
1st-century BC physicians
Ancient Indian writers